Ferentillo is a comune (municipality) in the Province of Terni in the Italian region Umbria, located about 60 km southeast of Perugia and about 12 km northeast of Terni. The comune, located in the valley of the Nera, is divided by the river into the burghs of Matterella and Precetto.

Ferentillo borders the following municipalities: Arrone, Leonessa, Montefranco, Monteleone di Spoleto, Polino, Scheggino, Spoleto.

History

Remains of ancient settlements include an Etruscan necropolis outside Ferentillo, at Caldane. The town developed around a 14th castle (Castello di Madonna), first owned by the Monaldeschi della Cervara, then of the Spada and the Dukes of Montevecchio.

Main sights
At Matterella:
Collegiata di Santa Maria (13th century), with fresco of Raphael school.
Medieval castle
At Precetto:
Church of Santo Stefano (16th century), with frescoes of Perugino school. The crypt is from the 14th century and has frescoes of the same age.
Museum of Mummies
Medieval castle
Palazzo Montholon
At Macenano:
Abbey of San Pietro in Valle (6th-8th centuries), with 13th-century frescoes.

Demographic evolution

Frazioni
The biggest fraction is Macenano where the San Pietro in Valle Abbey is located. Other fractions are:

Umbriano, Ampognano, Castellonalto, Castellone Basso, Colle Olivo, Colli, Gabbio, Leazzano, Le Mura, Lorino, Macchialunga, Macelletto, Macenano, Terria, Monterivoso, Nicciano, Sambucheto, San Mamiliano.

Twin towns
 Sérignan-du-Comtat, France

References

External links
 Official website

Cities and towns in Umbria
Castles in Italy